The Mechanik (released under the alternative title known as The Russian Specialist) is a 2005 German-American action film starring and directed by Dolph Lundgren, who wrote with Bryan Edward Hill. The film co-stars Ben Cross, Ivan Petrushinov, Olivia Lee and Raicho Vasilev. Most of the film was shot in Bulgaria and there are many Bulgarian actors in the cast as well.

Plot 
Retired Spetsnaz soldier Nikolai "Nick" Cherenko (Dolph Lundgren) is a mechanic in the small Russian village of Gorelovo. His wife, Alina (Hilda van der Meulen), and son, Vanya (Naum Shopov) are killed by Russian mob boss Aleksandr "Sasha" Popov (Ivan Petrushinov) when he and his gang start a shootout after a bad drug deal.  Nick arms himself and takes his revenge one night, killing five of Popov's men.  Finally he shoots Popov in the face, leaving him for dead.

7 years later, Nick works as a mechanic in Los Angeles. Wealthy widow Mary Abramoff (Levana Finkelstein) tracks him down and pleads with him to go to Russia and retrieve her daughter Julia (Olivia Lee), who has been kidnapped and forced into the sex trade.  Nick refuses, claiming he is just a mechanic. John Ridley (Atanas Srebrev),  Mary's attorney reveals that they know his past, but he continues to refuse.  Finally he is convinced when Mary reveals that the man who killed her husband and took her daughter is Sasha, still alive, and Nick sets off to St. Petersburg, Russia.

British mercenary William Burton (Ben Cross) offers to take a prostitute, Natalia, away with him after "a job," but she refuses.  He stumbles, drunk, into his apartment, where he is confronted by Nick.  After sobering him up, Nick takes him to the club where Sasha hides out.  Nick immediately attacks the guards and demands to see Sasha despite Burton's insistence they play it cool.  Burton pulls him away and says they will return the next night; Burton fears Nick has compromised their mission.

The following night, Natalia lets Nick, Burton and a group of Russian mercenaries (Yuri, Sergei, Alexi, and Pavel) into the club.  They find Julia, strung out, and escape the club in a shootout where only 2 of the Russian mercenaries, Yuri (Asen Blatechki), and Sergei (Antony Argirov) survive; Sergei has been badly wounded in the leg.  They begin driving to the Finnish border and Sasha's thugs give chase.  Nick buys them time by luring the thugs into a tunnel, changing cars and setting off a bomb.

The group stop at a farm house to tend to Sergei then proceed to the border which has closed for the night; they stay with their contact, Misha,  one of Nick's former Spetsnaz soldiers.  Sasha stops at the farm house and determines Nick is headed for the border and he continues to chase them.  The next morning, Sergei dies of his injuries, and Sasha arrives and Nick's group (Burton, Yuri, and Misha) prepares for a fight.  Sasha tries to lure Burton out by bringing Natalia, whom he kills, angering Burton.  Nick and his group split up and begin picking off Sasha's men.  Finally, Nick confronts Sasha, who grabs Julia.  She scratches his face to distract him and Nick shoots his leg; he crawls away but Nick executes him with a shot to the head.

Burton and Yuri accompany Julia across the border to Finland where she is reunited with her mother.  Nick walks away from the village to Saint Petersburg, his path unknown.

Cast

References 
 
 

2005 films
2005 direct-to-video films
2005 action films
American films about revenge
American action films
English-language German films
Films directed by Dolph Lundgren
Films scored by Elia Cmíral
Films shot in Bulgaria
Films shot in Saint Petersburg
German action films
Nu Image films
2000s Russian-language films
2000s American films
2000s German films